Joseph Cabassol (1859–1928) was a French lawyer, politician, and banker. He served as the Mayor of Aix-en-Provence from 1902 to 1908.

Biography

Early life
Joseph Marie Victor Cabassol was born on 21 January 1859 in Aix-en-Provence. His father, Joseph Philippe Cabassol (1828-1855), was a banker who co-founded a small bank with Louis-Auguste Cézanne (1798–1886), the father of renowned painter Paul Cézanne (1839-1906), called the Cézanne and Cabassol Bank, in 1848, until it failed. His mother was Euphrosine Caroline Rose (1833-1855). He was educated in a Catholic school in Aix, and studied the Law at the University of Aix-en-Provence. He received his Doctorate in Law in 1885. He spoke both French and Provençal.

Career
He started his career as a lawyer in 1880. He served as bâtonnier from 1903 to 1905. He was elected as President of the Court of Appeals of Aix on 12 June 1917 and as its First President on 18 April 1927. In 1919, he served as President of the Société des Amis des Arts, a Freemason order in Aix. Later, he joined the Board of Directors of the local Caisse d'Épargne.

He decided to embark upon a career in politics and joined the Republican Union. He was elected to the General Council of Aix-Sud from 1898 to 1916, serving as its president in 1914. He served as the Mayor of Aix-en-Provence from 1902 to 1908. Under his tenure, he opened the Museum d'Histoire Naturelle Aix-en-Provence, which had been conceived by Antoine Aude (1799-1870), when he served as Mayor in 1835. Moreover, he rejected the proposed move of Aix-Marseille University to Marseille, making sure that it would remain in Aix.

He received the Knighthood of the Legion of Honour for his public service.

Author
He wrote a book of poems, Solitude, and a play, La dernière marquise. Additionally, he published articles in the Gazette du palais and the Répertoire encyclopédique.

Personal life
In 1886, he married Gabrielle Rose, an extended cousin. They had three children:
Jean Joseph Louis Marie Cabassol (1887-1916). He died while serving in the First World War.
Simone Cabassol (1989-1976).
Gabriel Cabassol (1901-1978).

Death and legacy
Cabassol died on 25 May 1928 in Aix-en-Provence. The Rue Joseph Cabassol in the Quartier Mazarin in Aix-en-Provence is named in his honour. The Hôtel de Caumont, a listed hôtel particulier, is on this street.

Bibliography

Non-fiction
Compte rendu de l’inauguration du buste de Zola (1906)
Eloge pour sa réception à l’Académie du Dr Philippe Aude (1913)
Le Parlement d’Aix, défenseur des droits et des traditions de la Provence (1919)
Charles Giraud, (juriste) sa vie, ses œuvres (1924)

Poems
Solitude (1885)

Play
La dernière marquise (1923)

References

See also

 Legion of Honour
 List of Legion of Honour recipients by name (C)
 Legion of Honour Museum

1859 births
1928 deaths
People from Aix-en-Provence
Mayors of Aix-en-Provence
19th-century French lawyers
French bankers
Chevaliers of the Légion d'honneur
French Freemasons
20th-century French judges